Kottakkal pooram is a temple festival in Sree Viswambhara Temple, Kottakkal, Malappuram District in Kerala, India.

Dhanvantari
It is celebrated to honour Dhanvantari, the patron god of medicine and health.

Programs
The grand celebrations in connection with the festival also includes cultural programmes by artists. During the seven days, famous classical artists of the country perform..Cultural Programmes Includes Kathakali, Mohiniyattam

References

Hindu festivals in Kerala
Festivals in Malappuram district